The Apamean spring minnow (Pseudophoxinus maeandri) is a species of cyprinid fish.

It is found only in Turkey.
Its natural habitats are rivers and freshwater lakes.
It is threatened by habitat loss.

References

Pseudophoxinus
Endemic fauna of Turkey
Fish described in 1960
Taxonomy articles created by Polbot